Pasiphila is a genus of moths in the family Geometridae. As of 2005 about 36 species were known, and of these, some 27 are native to New Zealand.

Species
Pasiphila acompsa
Pasiphila aristias
Pasiphila bilineolata
Pasiphila charybdis
Pasiphila chloerata - sloe pug
Pasiphila coelica
Pasiphila cotinaea
Pasiphila debiliata
Pasiphila derasata
Pasiphila dryas
Pasiphila erratica
Pasiphila excisa
Pasiphila fumipalpata
Pasiphila furva
Pasiphila halianthes
Pasiphila heighwayi
Pasiphila humilis
Pasiphila hyrcanica
Pasiphila kumakurai
Pasiphila lita
Pasiphila lunata
Pasiphila magnimaculata
Pasiphila malachita
Pasiphila melochlora
Pasiphila muscosata
Pasiphila nebulosa
Pasiphila obscura
Pasiphila plinthina
Pasiphila punicea
Pasiphila rectangulata - green pug
Pasiphila rivalis
Pasiphila rubella
Pasiphila sandycias
Pasiphila semochlora
Pasiphila socotrensis
Pasiphila subcinctata
Pasiphila suffusa
Pasiphila urticae
Pasiphila vieta

Taxonomy
Pasiphila was formerly treated as a synonym of Chloroclystis, as was Gymnodisca, which is now mostly treated as a subgenus of Pasiphila. Rhinoprora is sometimes treated as a synonym of subgenus Gymnodisca.

Furthermore, a number of species which were included in Pasiphila are now mostly placed in Pasiphilodes.

References

 
Eupitheciini